Mark Thomas  was an English politician who sat in the House of Commons in 1659.

Thomas was the son of Mark Thomas  of Rye, Sussex. He was admitted at Emmanuel College, Cambridge on 27 May 1633. He migrated to Trinity College, Cambridge and was admitted at Middle Temple on 12 November 1634. In 1636 he was awarded BA. In 1659, Thomas was elected Member of Parliament for Rye in the Third Protectorate Parliament.

References

Year of birth missing
Year of death missing
English MPs 1659
People from Rye, East Sussex
Alumni of Emmanuel College, Cambridge
Alumni of Trinity College, Cambridge
Members of the Middle Temple